Crooked Lake Provincial Park is a recreational provincial park in the south-east region of the Canadian province of Saskatchewan. It is located along the north-eastern shore of Crooked Lake in the Qu'Appelle Valley in the RM of Grayson No. 184. The community of Sunset Beach is adjacent to the eastern boundary of the park and access is from Highway 247.

Crooked Lake Provincial Park has a campground with electric and non-electric sites, potable water, showers, and washrooms. All of the campsites are a short distance from Crooked Lake, which has a beach and picnic area, boat launch, and fish cleaning station. Fish commonly found in the lake include walleye, perch, and northern pike.

See also 
List of protected areas of Saskatchewan
Tourism in Saskatchewan

References 

Provincial parks of Saskatchewan
Grayson No. 184, Saskatchewan